Ramalakshmi Cine Creations   is an Indian film production company established by Sridhar Lagadapati in 2005. The following article lists films produced by Sridhar Lagadapati under Larsco Entertainment, later under the banner of Ramalakshmi Cine Creations (owned by Larsco Entertainment). Today Larsco Entertainment is named Sirisuns Entertainment, which is still owned by Sridhar Lagadapati and Sirisha Lagadapati.

Film production

References

External links
 Ramalakshmi Cine Creations on Facebook
 Ramalakshmi Cine Creations on YouTube

Mass media companies established in 2005
Film production companies based in Hyderabad, India
Indian companies established in 2005
2005 establishments in Andhra Pradesh